Joseph Pabst (1870 – 19 May 1924) was a New Zealand cricketer. He played five first-class matches for Auckland between 1894 and 1898.

See also
 List of Auckland representative cricketers

References

External links
 

1870 births
1924 deaths
New Zealand cricketers
Auckland cricketers
Sportspeople from Bendigo